Juan Gil de Hontañón (Rasines, Cantabria 1480 – Salamanca, 11 May 1531) was a master builder and Trasmeran mason of Spain during the 16th century.  His first work was associated with Segovia, where he was associated with the school of Juan Guas.  Hontañón was involved in the building of the Isabelline Gothic Segovia Cathedral, the castle of Turégano, various monasteries, and the Cathedral of Palencia.  

At Salamanca, he was involved in the construction of the new cathedral there in 1512 and, in 1513, worked on the Cathedral of Seville until 1516.  He then worked at Segovia again, as well as at Zamora and at Granada. 

His sons, who continued some of his works, were Rodrigo Gil de Hontañón and Juan Gil de Hontañón the Younger.

1480 births
1531 deaths
People from Asón-Agüera
Architects from Cantabria
16th-century Spanish architects
Gothic architects